Kai Tak North is one of the 25 constituencies in the Kowloon City District of Hong Kong which was created in 2015.

The constituency loosely covers Kai Ching Estate and part of Tak Long Estate in San Po Kong with the estimated population of 16,562.

Councillors represented

Election results

2010s

References

Constituencies of Hong Kong
Constituencies of Kowloon City District Council
2015 establishments in Hong Kong
Constituencies established in 2015
Kai Tak Development